The Peninsula Library System (PLS) is a consortium of public and community college libraries in San Mateo County, California, United States, which serves the part of the San Francisco Bay Area known as "The Peninsula". The system has dozens of branches in local communities and at various area community colleges, a bookmobile, and automated book kiosks called Library-a-Go-Go.

The Peninsula Library System's mission states that it "strengthens local libraries through cooperation, enabling them to provide better service to their diverse communities."

Member libraries
Peninsula Library System is a consortium of libraries, whose members are the branches of the San Mateo County Libraries, individual city libraries and their branches, and area community college libraries.

There are two branches in Burlingame: One main library, and one at Easton. The PLS includes the libraries at Cañada College, College of San Mateo, and Skyline College. There are four branches in Daly City: The John D. Daly branch on Hillside, the Bayshore branch, the Serramonte branch, and the Westlake branch. Menlo Park has both a main branch and a branch at Belle Haven. The Downtown Library, Schaberg Branch Library, and Redwood Shores Branch Library comprise the three library locations in the community of Redwood City. San Mateo has a main downtown location plus two minor branches, while South San Francisco has two a self-titled branches, both a main branch and one on Grand Avenue. Pacifica has two branches at Sanchez and Sharp Park. The remaining cities—San Bruno, Atherton, Belmont, Brisbane, East Palo Alto, Foster City, Half Moon Bay, Millbrae, San Carlos, Woodside, and Portola Valley—have one location each.

See also

Santa Clara County Library District
San Francisco Public Library
Interlibrary loan

References

External links
 
 

Libraries in San Mateo County, California
Peninsula
Buildings and structures in San Mateo County, California
Library
1971 establishments in California